Gareth Patrick Reynolds (born November 27, 1979) is an American-British comedian, producer, writer, and podcaster. He is best known for co-hosting The Dollop, a comedy podcast in which his friend and fellow comedian Dave Anthony tells him a particularly shocking or notable story from American history about which Reynolds knows nothing.

Early life 
Gareth Patrick Reynolds was born in Brown Deer, Wisconsin, on November 27, 1979, the son of English immigrants. He has an older brother. Through his parents, he holds dual British and American citizenship. His mother, Pam, is from Birmingham and has since moved back to England. Reynolds attended Emerson College in Boston, where he joined the improv group Swollen Monkeys. Upon graduating in 2003, he moved to Los Angeles to continue his comedy career.

Career 
In 1997, at the age of 18, Reynolds performed his first stand-up show at Comedy Sportz in Milwaukee. In 2005, he worked on the NBC prank/hidden camera series The Real Wedding Crashers. He co-hosts the podcast Point vs. Point with Evan Mann.

Reynolds has written and produced for a number of television shows, including Arrested Development and MTV's Failosophy. With his writing partner Evan Mann, he starred in a short-lived show on the Travel Channel called Mancations. He continues to write and produce stand-up comedy. In 2019, he released his debut comedy album, Riddled with Disease, which went to No. 1 on the Billboard charts the week it was released.

Reynolds is best known as the co-host of the comedy history podcast The Dollop, which debuted in 2014. In the show, co-host Dave Anthony tells Reynolds a particularly shocking or notable story from American history about which Reynolds knows nothing. As a running joke on the show, Anthony often shortens Reynolds' first name from "Gareth" to "Gary", which Reynolds dislikes. Anthony and Reynolds co-wrote a book based on the podcast, The United States of Absurdity: Untold Stories from American History, in 2017. Screenwriter Josh Olson once described the book as "a great bathroom read".

During the COVID-19 pandemic, Reynolds began featuring his mother Pam on a comedic YouTube series called Pamdemic. He also hosted a weekly show from his bedroom called Ga'riffs, where he riffed on topics submitted by viewers.

Personal life 
Reynolds lives in Los Angeles with his cat, José, who is often featured or mentioned on his podcasts. He is a fan of the Green Bay Packers and has a Packers tattoo on his right arm.

Filmography

References 

1980 births
American male writers
American podcasters
American stand-up comedians
Emerson College alumni
Living people
People from Milwaukee County, Wisconsin